Heinz Peter may refer to:

Heinz Günthardt (born 1959), also known as Heinz Peter Günthardt, a Swiss tennis player
Heinz Peter Knes (born 1969), German photographer
Heinz Peter Platter (born 1967), Italian alpine skier
Heinz-Peter Thül (born 1963), German professional golfer
Heinz-Peter Überjahn (born 1948), German football manager

See also
Hinzpeter, a surname